The Secrets of Paris is a 1922 American silent drama film directed by Kenneth S. Webb and starring Lew Cody, Gladys Hulette, and Effie Shannon.

Cast

Preservation
No copies of The Secrets of Paris are located in any archives, making this a lost film.

References

Bibliography
 Munden, Kenneth White. The American Film Institute Catalog of Motion Pictures Produced in the United States, Part 1. University of California Press, 1997.

External links

1922 films
1922 drama films
Silent American drama films
Films directed by Kenneth Webb
American silent feature films
1920s English-language films
American black-and-white films
Films set in Paris
1920s American films